Jamal Deen Haruna (born 23 October 1999) is a Ghanaian professional footballer who plays as a centre-back for Ghanaian Premier League side Accra Great Olympics.

Career 
Haruna previously played for then Wa All Stars now Legon Cities FC. In 2019. he moved to Accra Great Olympics. He played 12 league matches in the 2019–20 Ghana Premier League season before the league was put on hold and later cancelled due to the COVID-19 pandemic.

References

External links 

 

Living people
1999 births
Association football defenders
Ghanaian footballers
Ghana Premier League players
Legon Cities FC players
Accra Great Olympics F.C. players